Massimiliano Bartoli, born in Bologna, Italy, is a chef and restaurateur.

Bartoli has worked at such restaurants as Rocco's on 22nd, the Miss Williamsburg Diner in Williamsburg, La Vineria in New York and the Houdini Kitchen Laboratory in Queens which he opened with partner Pilar Rigon in 2014.

References

External links

Living people
Italian chefs
Italian restaurateurs
Businesspeople from Bologna
Year of birth missing (living people)